Sulev Alajõe (born 12 December 1965 in Pärnu) is an Estonian politician and lecturer. He was a member of VII Riigikogu.

References

Living people
1965 births
Members of the Riigikogu, 1992–1995
University of Tartu alumni
Academic staff of the University of Tartu
Politicians from Pärnu